Hernán Barreneche Ríos (born July 25, 1939 in Pereira, Risaralda) is a long-distance runner from Colombia, who represented his native country at the 1972 Summer Olympics. He won the bronze medal in the men's marathon at the 1971 Pan American Games in Cali, Colombia. He has continued to compete at the World Masters Athletics and for the past 3 Games he has won gold in the marathon.

References
  Personal Website
 

1939 births
Living people
Colombian male long-distance runners
Athletes (track and field) at the 1972 Summer Olympics
Athletes (track and field) at the 1971 Pan American Games
Olympic athletes of Colombia
Pan American Games bronze medalists for Colombia
Pan American Games medalists in athletics (track and field)
Central American and Caribbean Games gold medalists for Colombia
Competitors at the 1962 Central American and Caribbean Games
Central American and Caribbean Games medalists in athletics
Medalists at the 1971 Pan American Games
People from Pereira, Colombia
20th-century Colombian people